Malacoctenus africanus is a species of labrisomid blenny endemic to the waters around the islands of Goree and N'Gor off the coast of Senegal.  This species prefers areas with rocky substrates in shallow waters.  It can reach a length of  TL.

References

africanus
Fish of West Africa
Endemic fauna of Senegal
Fish described in 1951
Taxa named by Jean Cadenat